Banner Springs is an unincorporated community in Fentress County, Tennessee, USA. It was the location of a post office from 1890 until 1961.

References

Unincorporated communities in Fentress County, Tennessee
Unincorporated communities in Tennessee